George Sutherland (1862–1942) was an English-born U.S. jurist and political figure.

George Sutherland may also refer to:
George Sutherland (author) (1855–1905), Scottish-born Australian writer
George Sutherland (athlete) (1903–1951), Canadian athlete
George Sutherland (footballer) (1876–1956), Australian rules footballer
George Alexander Sutherland (1861–1939), British cardiologist and paediatrician
George B. Sutherland, American artist and teacher
George Eaton Sutherland (1843–1899), American politician and jurist

See also
George Sutherland Fraser (1915–1980), Scottish poet, literary critic and academic
George Sutherland-Leveson-Gower, 2nd Duke of Sutherland (1786–1861), son of George Leveson-Gower, 1st Duke of Sutherland
George Sutherland-Leveson-Gower, 3rd Duke of Sutherland (1828–1892), son of the 2nd Duke
George Sutherland-Leveson-Gower, 5th Duke of Sutherland (1888–1963), son of the 4th Duke